The participation of Poland in the Turkvision Song Contest was expected to begin in Istanbul, Turkey, at the Turkvision Song Contest 2016. The national broadcaster responsible for the selection process of Poland's participants has yet to be known. Poland had selected Olga Shimanskaya with her song "Masal gibi bu dünya", as their debut entry. However, the 2016 contest was subsequently cancelled due to the December 2016 Istanbul bombings, leading Poland to debut at the 2020 contest four years later,

Origins of the contest
Turkvision is an annual song contest which was created by TÜRKSOY in cooperation with the Turkish music channel TMB TV. Based on the similar format of the Eurovision Song Contest, Turkvision focuses primarily on participating Turkic countries and regions. The participating countries and regions have to take part in the Semi Final. A juror from each nation awards between 1 and 10 points for every entry, except their own. An amount of 12 to 15 nations qualify for the Grand Final where the jury determines the winner. TÜRKSOY has stated that televoting is going to be introduced in the future. Unlike the Eurovision Song Contest in which the winning country proceeds to host the following year's event, hosting of the Turkvision Song Contest takes place in the country or region that is also hosting the Turkish Capital of Culture.

History

Turkvision Song Contest 2016
However, it was later confirmed that both of the 2016 contests had been cancelled due to the December 2016 Istanbul bombings.

Turkvision Song Contest 2017
Following the cancellation of the Turkvision Song Contest 2016, it was confirmed by the Ministry of Culture and Sports in Kazakhstan, that the 2017 edition would take place in Astana, Kazakhstan, and would coincide with other events taking place in the city as part of Expo 2017. The contest was originally going to be held at the Barys Arena, with the two semi-finals taking place on 8 and 9 September, and the final on 10 September 2017. However, on 27 March 2017, it was announced that the dates and venue had subsequently been changed, with the Saryarka Velodrome as the new venue, and the contest itself taking place on 29 and 31 August 2017. Poland confirmed on 28 February, that they would continue with their decision to debut at the Turkvision Song Contest, and will stick with their selected representative Olga Shimanskaya and her song "Masal gibi bu dünya" to mark their debut at the Turkvision Song Contest 2017.

Turkvision Song Contest 2020 

Poland debuted in the Turkvision Song Contest 2020, represented by the song "Doğma Yerlər" performed by Mishelle (Olga Natskowicz). The song was written in Azerbaijani, and composed by Dmitriy Kireenkov and Elcan Rzayev. They performed 9th on the night of the contest, following  and preceding . This debut performance earned Poland an 18th place out of 26 finalists.

Participation overview

See also 
 Poland in the Eurovision Dance Contest – A dance contest organised by the European Broadcasting Union (EBU).
 Poland in the Eurovision Song Contest – A song contest organised by the EBU.
 Poland in the Eurovision Young Dancers – A competition organised by the EBU for younger dancers aged between 16 and 21.
 Poland in the Eurovision Young Musicians – A competition organised by the EBU for musicians aged 18 years and younger.
 Poland in the Intervision Song Contest – An international song contest consisting of both Post-Soviet states and members of the Shanghai Cooperation Organisation.
 Poland in the Junior Eurovision Song Contest – A song contest for children, organised by the EBU.

References

Countries in the Turkvision Song Contest
Turkvision